The 2022 Hi-Tec Oils Bathurst 6 Hour is a endurance race for Group 3E Series Production Cars. It will be the sixth running of the Bathurst 6 Hour.

Entries

Classes

Entry List

Qualifying

Race results

References

Hi-Tec
Motorsport in Bathurst, New South Wales